Too Good to Stop Now is the fifth studio album by American actor and country music artist John Schneider. It was released in 1984 via MCA Records. The album includes the singles "I've Been Around Enough to Know" and "Country Girls".

Track listing

Personnel
Adapted from liner notes.

Electric Guitar: Billy Joe Walker Jr., Larry Rolando
Acoustic Guitar: Billy Joe Walker Jr.
Bass Guitar: Tom Robb
Drums: Matt Betton
Keyboards: John Barlow Jarvis
Viola: Buddy Spicher
Trombone: Rex Peer
Clarinet: John Gore
Trumpet: Terry Mead
Background Vocals: Bill Lamb, Thom Flora
Lead Vocals, Vocal Harmonies: John Schneider

Chart performance

References

1984 albums
John Schneider (screen actor) albums
Albums produced by Jimmy Bowen
MCA Records albums